Rainer-Marc Frey (born January 10, 1963) is a Swiss businessman and investor. He has substantially shaped the Swiss financial services sector and the international hedge fund industry.

Career 

Rainer-Marc Frey was born on January 10, 1963, in the Swiss canton of Basel-Landschaft. Following his Matura graduation in economics at the Gymnasium of Liestal, he studied economics at the renowned University of St. Gallen. He graduated summa cum laude with a degree in economics (lic. oec. HSG) in 1986.

After his studies, he gained his first professional experience at the American investment banks Merrill Lynch and Salomon Brothers and quickly rose in the ranks. At Salomon Brothers, he opened new trading departments in Zürich and Frankfurt. He left the firm in 1992 and founded his own hedge fund – the RMF Investment Group -   along with two partners in Zug.

RMF Investment Group 

The investment thesis of hedge funds, i.e. achieving above average returns compared to the reference market and reducing risk through hedging strategies, was widely unknown in Switzerland at the time and was met by scepticism among investors. RMF achieved ground-breaking results. At the beginning, banks and insurance companies in Switzerland did not see the potential in this type of fund, which aimed to also make gains in sideways or negative trending markets. As such, RMF started trading on Japanese warrants and convertible bonds. It was one of the first active hedge fund groups in Europe. RMF’s investment thesis proved successful, despite difficult periods such as the 1997 Asian financial crisis. Following these dry spell periods, institutional investors started accepting these concepts.

A successful collaboration with LGT Group and Swiss Life (then Schweizerische Lebensversicherungs- und Rentenanstalt) started in 1996 with the launch of Castle Alternative Invest, a hedge fund investment company. Swiss Life were expanding their alternative investment activities rapidly and built a stake of 23.5% of RMF valued at CHF 44 million in 1998, respectively 2000. Further cooperations with insurance companies followed in subsequent years. As the dot-com bubble burst in 2001, market neutral strategies of hedge funds became increasingly popular. The same year, Credit Suisse invested close to CHF 4 billion in hedge fund strategies through RMF. By 2002, most large Swiss insurers were among RMF’s key clients.

Between 1996 and 2002, RMF Investment Group developed into one of Europe's leading alternative asset managers. Assets under management reached USD 8.5 billion in 2002. The same year, Man Group plc made a takeover offer of approximately CHF 1.35 billion for RMF. The RMF shareholders accepted this offer and it merged with the Man Group. As part of the deal, RMF’s 12-member management team committed itself to remain on board at the merged company for 3 years. Through this acquisition, the Man Group became the world’s largest provider of hedge fund investments.

Horizon21 

The sale of his stake in RMF resulted in proceeds of approximately CHF 500 million for Frey. However, Frey and his partners continued to pursue new business ideas. In 2004 already, they founded their next investment firm, which would specialize in alternative investments, Horizon 21 AG, headquartered in Pfäffikon, Schwyz.

In September 2005, Swiss Re became a strategic partner to Horizon21 and acquired a 20% stake in the Horizon21 Alternative Investments business unit. A year later, the partnership between the two firms grew stronger, as they joined efforts in the private equity fund of funds business. Horizon21 took over the private equity activities of Swiss Re, which in turn bought 30% of the Horizon21 Private Equity Holding.

Since the inception of Horizon21, the management of the founders’ and partners’ wealth has been a focal point of its activities. Following a strategic re-orientation in 2010, Horizon21 positioned itself as a private investment office and it tailors its activities around the founders’ and partners’ investment needs.

Investments 

Since the sale of RMF, Frey has made himself a name as an industrial investor through stakes in several companies. As private investor and majority shareholder, he was able to share his entrepreneurial experiences with the companies in which he invested.

In October 2008, Frey was named onto the Board of Directors of the then crisis-ridden UBS. The nomination of Frey was intended to bring back more knowledge of the financial industry into the board of directors. Frey was considered as an independent spirit with a strong voice. He was a member of the Risk Committee, as well as the Audit Committee and was later also appointed to the Human Resources and Compensation Committee. In April 2014, he decided not to present himself for reelection to the board of directors in order to pursue other professional engagements.

Frey is a member of the Board of Directors of DKSH since 2008 and he serves on the Audit and Strategy Committees. DKSH is an internationally active market expansion services group, which is deeply rooted in communities across Asia Pacific and headquartered in Zürich. Frey holds a 3.9% equity stake in DKSH.

Since 2010, he also holds a stake of currently 8.67% in the Swiss pharmaceuticals company Siegfried Holding AG, based in Zofingen.

Frey is main shareholder and Vice-Chairman of the Board of Directors of Lonrho Holdings Ltd since 2013. The company is a diversified conglomerate, which is active in Sub-Saharan Africa. He submitted a takeover bid to the former shareholders in 2013 alongside Swiss entrepreneur Thomas Schmidheiny. The takeover was finalized on July 19, 2013, and taken private for a value of CHF 270 million.

Philanthropy 

Frey is the Vice-President of the Board of the Frey Charitable Foundation (FCF), founded in 2004. In Africa, FCF focuses on supporting outstanding social entrepreneurs in a variety of thematic areas.

In his free time, Frey is a pilot.

See also

 Lonrho Holdings Ltd
 DKSH Holding AG
 UBS AG

References 

Swiss businesspeople
Swiss billionaires
Living people
1963 births